Paul Andrew Bancroft (born 10 September 1964) was an English professional footballer who played as a midfielder in the Football League for Derby County, Crewe Alexandra and Northampton Town.

References

1964 births
Footballers from Derby
English footballers
Association football midfielders
Derby County F.C. players
Crewe Alexandra F.C. players
Northampton Town F.C. players
Nuneaton Borough F.C. players
Burton Albion F.C. players
Kidderminster Harriers F.C. players
Kettering Town F.C. players
Shepshed Dynamo F.C. players
English Football League players
England semi-pro international footballers
Living people